Actinopyga lecanora, commonly known as the white-bottomed sea cucumber, is a species of sea cucumber in the family Holothuriidae. It is native to the tropical Western Indo-Pacific region and is harvested for food.

Description
The top and bottom of the sea cucumber is a mottled tan-orange colour, and the anus is surrounded with a white ring, lending the sea cucumber its common name.

Distribution and habitat 
Actinopyga lecanora is found off the coasts of Asia and East Africa, in the tropical Indian Ocean and the western Pacific Ocean. Its range extends from Kenya and Madagascar to the west, to Papua New Guinea, the Philippines, Taiwan, and other island groups in the western Pacific. It is considered rare in the Taiping Islands and Taiwan.

Status
This species is harvested commercially for food and traditional medicine in some parts of its range, and is of medium commercial importance. It is used in the production of bêche-de-mer in 13 different countries in the Western Central Pacific. In Papua New Guinea, it is subject to a minimum size limit of  if fresh and  if dry, as well as a designated fishing season between January 16 and September 30 to prevent overfishing. The IUCN lists its conservation status as data deficient.

References

Holothuriidae
Fauna of the Indian Ocean
Fauna of the Pacific Ocean
Animals described in 1833